The Body is a 2001 mystery thriller drama film written and directed by Jonas McCord. Based on the 1983 novel of the same name by Richard Sapir, it stars Antonio Banderas, Olivia Williams, Jason Flemyng, Lillian Lux, John Wood, and Derek Jacobi. It is a joint American-Israeli-German co-production, shot on-location in Jerusalem and Tel Aviv.

The plot follows Father Matt Gutierrez (Banderas), a Jesuit priest sent by the Vatican to investigate an archaeologic finding by Dr. Sharon Golban (Williams) which is suspected to be the remains of the body of Jesus Christ. This finding puts Gutierrez's faith and his doubts in constant confrontation with Golban's scientific views, and stirs political tensions between Palestine and Israel, while also shaking the foundations of Christianity itself.

The film was released on April 20, 2001, by TriStar Pictures and received mixed critical reviews.

Plot summary

Dr. Sharon Golban finds an ancient skeleton in Jerusalem in a rich man's tomb. Coloration of the wrist and ankle bones indicates the cause of death was crucifixion. Several artifacts, including a gold coin bearing the marks of Pontius Pilate and a jar dating to 32 AD, date the tomb to the year Jesus died. Faint markings on the skull consistent with thorns, the absence of broken leg bones, occupational markers suggesting the deceased was a carpenter, and a nick on the ribs from a pointed object lead authorities to suspect that these could be the bones of Jesus. The different reactions of politicians, clerics, religious extremists—some prepared to use terror to gain their ends—to the religious, cultural and political implications of the find, make life difficult and dangerous for the investigators as they seek to unearth the truth.

Father Matt Gutierrez is assigned by the Vatican to investigate the case and to protect the Christian faith. He sets out to prove that the bones are not those of Jesus, but as there is more and more evidence to support the claim, his faith begins to waver. Troubled by the case, he turns to Father Lavelle who commits suicide because he cannot reconcile the scientific evidence with his faith. This event causes Father Gutierrez to turn from his faith, but he comes back to it in the end when it is revealed that the body is in fact not Jesus's body but one of his followers who died in a similar way during the First Jewish–Roman War. He also comes to understand that it is the power of the Catholic Church that he is protecting and not the faith, and decides to resign from his priesthood.

Cast

 Antonio Banderas as Father Matt Gutierrez
 Olivia Williams as Dr. Sharon Golban
Jason Flemyng as Father Walter Winstead
John Shrapnel as Moshe Cohen
 Derek Jacobi as Father Lavelle
 Lillian Lux as Mrs. kahn
John Wood as Cardinal Pesci
Mohammed Bakri as Abu Yusef
 Makram Khoury as Nasir Hamid
Sami Samir as Ahmed
 Vernon Dobtcheff as Monsignore
Jordan Licht as Dorene Golban
Limor Goldstein as Galic
Ariel Horowitz as Reb Nechtal
Arieh Elias as Fahri
John Glover as Street Performer

Themes
The film deals mainly with two subjects:
 The Israeli–Palestinian conflict in the region where the body is found. Both sides believe that control of the site will give them an upper hand in the conflict.
 The importance of the resurrection of Jesus Christ in the Christian faith.

External links

References

 http://www.shroud.com/meacham2.htm

2001 films
German thriller drama films
Israeli thriller drama films
American political drama films
American political thriller films
2001 thriller drama films
Political thriller films
Films about Christianity
Films set in Jerusalem
Political drama films
Films based on American novels
Films based on thriller novels
Films about archaeology
2001 drama films
2000s English-language films
2000s American films
2000s German films